Latiromitra cryptodon is a species of sea snail, a marine gastropod mollusk in the family Costellariidae.

Description
The length of the shell attains 29.6 mm.

Distribution
This species occurs in the Atlantic Ocean off Morocco.

References

 MEDIN. (2011). UK checklist of marine species derived from the applications Marine Recorder and UNICORN. version 1.0
 Sysoev A.V. (2014). Deep-sea fauna of European seas: An annotated species check-list of benthic invertebrates living deeper than 2000 m in the seas bordering Europe. Gastropoda. Invertebrate Zoology. Vol.11. No.1: 134–155

External links
 Fischer P. (1882-1883). Diagnoses d'espèces nouvelles de mollusques recueillis dans le cours des expéditions scientifiques de l'aviso "Le Travailleur" (1880 et 1881). Journal de Conchyliologie 30: 49-53 [1882], 273-277
 Locard, A. (1897-1898). Expéditions scientifiques du Travailleur et du Talisman pendant les années 1880, 1881, 1882 et 1883. Mollusques testacés. Paris, Masson.
 Bayer, F. M. (1971). New and unusual Mollusks collected by R/V John Elliott Pillsbury and R/V Gerda in the tropical Western Atlantic. Bulletin of Marine Science. 21(1): 111-236
 Gofas, S.; Le Renard, J.; Bouchet, P. (2001). Mollusca. in: Costello, M.J. et al. (eds), European Register of Marine Species: a check-list of the marine species in Europe and a bibliography of guides to their identification. Patrimoines Naturels. 50: 180-213.
 Bouchet P. & Kantor Y. (2000). The anatomy and systematics of Latiromitra, a genus of tropical deep-water Ptychatractinae (Gastropoda: Turbinellidae). The Veliger 43(1): 1-23

Costellariidae
Gastropods described in 1882